Her Royal Highness..? was a comedy/drama play (billed as "an affectionate comedy") by Royce Ryton and Ray Cooney, who also directed.

Production
After opening at the Theatre Royal, Lincoln in September 1981 and touring to several UK theatres, it transferred to the Palace Theatre, London in November 1981 where it ran until the end of January 1982. The deliberately cheeky publicity 'strap-line' read "Come and see Her Royal Highness at The Palace".

It starred Marc Sinden, Eva Lohman, Rona Anderson, Timothy Carlton, Morar Kennedy, Gwen Nelson, David Cunningham, Mansel David and Tony Steedman.

Sinden had been cast to play the lead role of Prince Charles as a result of his portrayal of the same character in the Ray Davies/Kinks musical, Chorus Girls at the Theatre Royal, Stratford East earlier in 1981.

The production photographs were taken by Lord Patrick Lichfield, who had taken the photographs of the real Royal Wedding in July of the same year and the lighting was designed by Joe Davis (who had been Marlene Dietrich's bespoke theatrical lighting designer).

Plot
The plot of the comedy/drama purports to tell the ‘true’ story of Diana Spencer (played by Eva Lohman) during the week before her wedding to Prince Charles (played by Marc Sinden).

The young bride-to-be loses her nerve and flees to a secret hideout. However, with all that is at stake, the wedding to Prince Charles must go ahead – a ‘double’ for Diana has to be found and schooled within the week. The best look-alike is found in a shanty town in Australia and during the course of the next week the play charts a course between romantic comedy, thriller and drama, with the 'Diana' stand-in being schooled in all things 'Royal' by the real Diana's mother (Rona Anderson), the Queen (Morar Kennedy) and the Queen Mother (Gwen Nelson) so as to pull-off the charade successfully, while a panicked courtier (Timothy Carlton) and a bemused bodyguard (Tony Steedman) try to pacify Prince Charles and persuade him to go ahead, while trying to keep the secret from a prying press.

According to the play's rights-holder, "Owing to subsequent events in the tragic life of the real Diana, this play is not available for performance at the present time".

Trivia
The marquee of the Palace Theatre when running this show can be seen in episode 4 of the BBC show Smiley's People.

References 

1981 plays
Charles III
Comedy plays
Diana, Princess of Wales
Plays based on real people
Plays by Ray Cooney
West End plays